Jeff Wayne, known as Big Daddy, is an American standup comedian who has performed in clubs, theaters and on national television shows.

Wayne was born and raised in Northern Kentucky. At age 14, he decided he wanted to become a stand-up comedian. As a young man, he moved to Los Angeles to become part of The Comedy Store. Developing an act and writing his own material, Wayne was soon traveling to comedy clubs around the United States.  He became aheadline act on the circuit, working the Improv clubs, Funny Bones clubs, and other comedy clubs. Wayne also did five tours for Carlsberg Beer in Europe.

In 1993, Wayne wrote and performed his one-man show, Big Daddy's Barbeque. Directed by Ted Lange, the show was a popular and critical success. Big Daddy's Barbeque ran for 16 weeks in Dallas and 10 weeks in Tempe and Seattle. Variety called the show a "one man riot" and declared Wayne "a new Will Rogers". The show was a pilot for television first for NBC, then UPN. Wayne has performed Big Daddy's Barbeque over 1,000 times.

Wayne has performed on TV shows on HBO, Showtime, A&E, Fuse TV, CNN, and FOX. He has also appeared on radio shows including Dennis Prager, Bob and Tom, NPR, Mancow, Larry Elder, Gary Burbank, Ken and John, and Bob Grant. Wayne has four nationally released CDs on the Uproar comedy label. Such publications as The New York Times, the Los Angeles Times, The Cleveland Plain Dealer, The Washington Post, and Sondags B.A. (Oslo, Norway) have written about Wayne.

Wayne lives in Los Angeles and is the divorced father of three. His hobby is collecting vintage show business memorabilia.

Articles
Grilling For Grins, The Minneapolis Star-Tribune, November 14, 1993
Hot Ticket Comedy: Big Daddy!, Twin Cities Reader, November 2–8, 1993
Wayne's World, Scene Magazine, Rochester, N.Y., July 1995
White Whine, The Washington Post, July 20, 1996
Big Daddy Rocks!, NPR, Derek McGinty, July 22, 1996
Saucy Humor Makes 'Barbeque' a Success, The Cleveland Plain Dealer, July 10, 1997
"Big Daddy's Humor" Brings To Hot Issues, Lexington Herald-Leader, August 8, 1997
"Best Bet? Big Daddy!", Cincinnati Enquirer, August 8, 1997
"Big Daddy Parties", Hamilton Journal-News, August 15, 1997
'Love Boat' Star and Comic Heat Up Grill, The Fresno Bee, May 23, 1999
Jeff Wayne's One Man Show, Chicago Tribune, April 14, 2000
This Barbeque is More Like a Roast! Village/Southwest News, November 20, 2001
Grilling Sacred Cows, Houston Press, November 8–14, 2001
Out In Right Field, The Wall Street Journal, August 28, 2004
3 Republican Jokers, See, Walk Into a …, The New York Times, August 28, 2004
A Funny Man, A Funny Face, A Good Time, Entertainer, Laughlin, Nevada June 18, 2008
Pioneer Playhouse serves up 'Big Daddy's Barbeque', Lexington Herald-Leader, August 27, 2010

References

External links
http://www.theseriouscomedysite.com/showreview.php?r_id=1132

http://home.earthlink.net/~jwaynecomic/appearances.html

American male comedians
21st-century American comedians
Living people
People from Kentucky
American stand-up comedians
Year of birth missing (living people)